This is a list of the men who have served in the capacity of Minister-President or equivalent office in Baden, Württemberg and Baden-Württemberg from the 19th century to the present.

Baden

Ministers-President of the Grand Duchy of Baden (1809–1918)
1809–1810: Sigismund von Reitzenstein
1810: Conrad Karl Friedrich von Andlau-Birseck
1810–1812: Christian Heinrich Gayling von Altheim
1812–1817: Karl Christian von Berckheim
1817–1818: Sigismund von Reitzenstein
1818–1831: Wilhelm Ludwig Leopold Reinhard von Berstett
1832–1833: Sigismund von Reitzenstein
1833–1838: Ludwig Georg von Winter
1838–1839: Karl Friedrich Nebenius
1839–1843: Friedrich Landolin Karl von Blittersdorf
1843–1845: Christian Friedrich von Boeckh
1845–1846: Karl Friedrich Nebenius
1846–1848: Johann Baptist Bekk
1848–1849: Karl Georg Hoffmann
1849–1850: Friedrich Adolf Klüber
1850–1856: Ludwig Rüdt von Collenberg-Bödigheim
1856–1860: Franz von Stengel
1861–1866: Anton Stabel
1866–1868: Karl Mathy
1868–1876: Julius Jolly
1876–1893: Ludwig Karl Friedrich Turban
1893–1901: Franz Wilhelm Nokk
1901–1905: Carl Ludwig Wilhelm Arthur von Brauer
1905–1917: Alexander von Dusch
1917–1918: Heinrich von Bodman

Presidents of the Republic of Baden (1918–1945) 
Political Party:

Württemberg

Ministers-President of the Kingdom of Württemberg (1821–1918)
1821–1831: Christian Friedrich von Otto
1831–1848: Paul Friedrich Theodor Eugen Reichsfreiherr von Maucler
1848–1849: Friedrich von Römer
1849–1850: Johannes von Schlayer
1850–1864: Joseph Freiherr von Linden
1864–1870: Karl Friedrich Gottlob Freiherr von Varnbüler von und zu Hemmingen
1870–1871: Adolf Graf von Taube (acting)
1871–1873: Johann August Freiherr von Wächter
1873–1900: Hermann Freiherr von Mittnacht
1900–1901: Max Freiherr Schott von Schottenstein
1901–1906: Wilhelm August von Breitling
1906–1918: Karl Freiherr von Weizsäcker
1918: Theodor Liesching

Presidents of the Free People's State of Württemberg (1918–1945)
Political Party:

Three States (1945–1952)

Minister-President of Württemberg-Baden 
Political Party:

Minister-President of Württemberg-Hohenzollern 
Political Party:

President of (South) Baden 
Political Party:

Baden-Württemberg (1952–present) 
 Minister-President of Baden-Württemberg
Political party:

See also
List of rulers of Baden
List of rulers of Württemberg

List
Minister-President
Minister-President
Minister-President
Baden-Württemberg
Government of Baden-Württemberg